Ivar Johansen or Johansson may refer to:

Ivar Johansen (bobsledder) (1910–1984), Norwegian bobsledder
Ivar Johansen (journalist) (1923–2005), Norwegian journalist
Ravi (Ivar Johansen) (born 1976), Norwegian singer
Ivar Johansson (wrestler) (1903–1979), Swedish wrestler
Ivar Johansson (politician) (1899–unknown), Swedish politician